Speculum Orbis Terrae ("Mirror of the World") was an atlas published by Cornelis de Jode in Antwerp in 1593. The atlas was largely a continuation of unfinished works of his father, Gerard de Jode, who died in 1591. Contemporary scholars consider many of de Jode's maps to be superior, both in detail and style, to those of the competing atlas of the time, Theatrum Orbis Terrarum, by Ortelius. However, de Jode's atlas never sold well.

After de Jode's death in 1600, the engraving plates were sold to J. B. Vrients (who also owned the Ortelius plates), and the complete work was not published again.

Gallery

References

External links
 ''Specvlvm orbis terrae'' (Antwerpen, 1593) - hand coloured second edition of the atlas from collection of the National Museum in Warsaw (Poland);

Atlases
1593 books
Cartography in the Dutch Republic